

Geography
Loscoat was, before 1945, a hamlet belonging to the village of Lambézellec(fr), which is now a large suburb of Brest. Part of the former hamlet has now become an industrial area(fr), whereas the rest has become a residential area.

World War II
As in all other hamlets around Brest, intense fighting between the American infantry forces and the German Wehrmacht took place in Loscoat during the Battle for Brest.  

Most notably, Private First Class Ernest Prussman, from the 13th Infantry Regiment, took over his squad on 8 September 1944 during the advance on "Les Coates" [wrong transliteration of Loscoat] in Brittany, and disarmed several Germans, including a machine gun crew. Shot by a German rifleman, his dying act was to unleash a hand grenade that killed the man who shot him.  He was awarded a Medal of Honor posthumously.

References
 "These are My Credentials!": The Story of the 8th Infantry Division, 1798-1944. This document does not explicitly state the name of Loscoat, but it gives a rather accurate location of the 13th Infantry Regiment on 8 September 1944, which helps identify "Les Coates" as Loscoat.
 Ernest W. Prussman, 13th Regiment of Infantry, Medal of Honor.
 Lambézellec aujourd'hui(fr), a document in French about the district of Lambézellec and the industrial and residential areas of Loscoat.

Maps
 Google Map of Loscoat.

History of Brest, France
Geography of Brest, France